Dorcadion spectabile is a species of beetle in the family Cerambycidae. It was described by Kraatz in 1873. It is known from Iran.

References

spectabile
Beetles described in 1873